This is a list of NCAA Division III men's ice hockey tournament Frozen Four appearances by team.

Total Frozen Four appearances

The following is a list of National Collegiate Athletic Association (NCAA) Division III college ice hockey teams that have qualified for the NCAA Division III Men's Ice Hockey Championship with teams listed by number of appearances as of 2022.

† = Appearance vacated by the NCAA.

See also
Frozen Four

References

Frozen Four Appearances By School